The 1924 Army Cadets football team represented the United States Military Academy in the 1924 college football season. In their second season under head coach John McEwan, the Cadets compiled a  record, shut out four of their eight opponents, and outscored all opponents by a combined total of 111 to 41.

In the annual Army–Navy Game, the Cadets defeated the Midshipmen  the team's only loss came to undefeated national champion Notre Dame, by a 13 to 7 score. 
 
Five Army players were recognized on the All-America team. Center Edgar Garbisch was selected as a first-team player by Walter Camp, Football World magazine, and All-Sports Magazine. Garbisch was later inducted into the College Football Hall of Fame. Guard August Farwick received first-team honors from the All-America Board, the Newspaper Enterprise Association, Billy Evans, and Walter Eckersall. End Frank Frazer was selected as a third-team player by Walter Camp. Harry Ellinger received third-team honors from Davis J. Walsh. Halfback Harry Wilson was selected as a third-team player by All-Sports Magazine.

Schedule

Players
 Henry Baxter
 Charles Born
 Brennan
 Samuel Brentnall
 Buell
 Daly
 Harry Ellinger
 August W. Farwick
 Frank G. Fraser
 Edgar Garbisch
 Joseph H. Gilbreth
 William N. Gillmore
 Welborn Griffith
 Louis Hammack
 Hammer
 Orville Hewitt
 Edwin Johnson
 Minnehan
 LaVern G. Sanders
 Frederick F. Scheiffler
 Schmidt
 Sievers
 Simonton
 Taylor
 Thomas Trapnell
 Henry Westphalinger
 Harry Wilson (College Football Hall of Fame)
 William Wood
 Prentice Yeomans

References

Army
Army Black Knights football seasons
Army Cadets football